Jon Snodgrass (July 27, 1941 – November 5, 2015) was a Panamanian author, born on July 27, 1941 in Colón, Panama to John Alphonso and Olivia Jane (Chestnut) Snodgrass.  He received his Ph.D. Sociology in 1972 at the University of Pennsylvania. He worked in the Department of Sociology at California State University in Los Angeles.

Snodgrass passed away in 2015 at his home in South Pasadena.

Works 
(Editor) for Men Against Sexism: A Book of Readings, Times Change Press, 1977.
The Jack-Roller at Seventy: A Fifty-Year Follow-Up, Lexington Books, 1982.
"Patriarchy and Phantasy: A Conception of Psychoanalytic Sociology" (The American Journal of Psychoanalysis, 43 (Fall 1983) 261-275)
Career Strategies Map and Guide, Career Strategies Center (South Pasadena, California), 1990.
Follow Your Career Star: A Career Quest Based on Inner Values, Kensington Books (New York) 1996.
Peace Knights of the Soul: Wisdom in 'Star Wars', Inner Circle Publishing, 2006.

References
Contemporary Authors Online, Gale, 2006. Reproduced in Biography Resource Center. Farmington Hills, Mich.: Thomson Gale. 2006. http://galenet.galegroup.com/servlet/BioRC
California State University in Los Angeles https://issuu.com/csulauniversitytimes/docs/211.02_11116

1941 births
2015 deaths
American sociologists